Lance Hill may refer to:

 Lance Hill (manufacturer), Australian manufacturer of the Hills Hoist, a height-adjustable rotary clothes line
 Lance Hill (soccer) (born 1972), retired U.S. soccer forward
Lance Hill (inventor) from IP Australia
Lance Hill (racing driver) from 1962 Bathurst Six Hour Classic
 R. Lance Hill (David Lee Henry), screenwriter and author of the book that the 1984 film The Evil That Men Do is based on